Rio Lobo is a 1970 American Western film directed and produced by Howard Hawks and starring John Wayne, from a screenplay by Burton Wohl and Leigh Brackett. The film was shot in Cuernavaca in the Mexican state of Morelos and in Tucson, Arizona. The musical score was composed by Jerry Goldsmith. It was the third Howard Hawks film varying the idea of a sheriff defending his office against belligerent outlaw elements in the town, after Rio Bravo (1959) and El Dorado (1966), both also starring John Wayne. Rio Lobo was the last film made by Hawks.

Plot
During the American Civil War, a secret Union army payroll train is raided by Confederates, led by Captain Pierre Cordona and Sergeant Tuscarora Phillips. Union Colonel Cord McNally loses his close friend, Lieutenant Ned Forsythe, in the raid, and the complexity of the Confederates' scheme indicates that Union traitors must have provided them with the details about the transport. In the ensuing pursuit, McNally's squad is spread thinner and thinner, until he is left alone and captured by the Confederates. McNally tricks them by leading them to a Union camp and raising the alarm; Cordona and Tuscarora are captured, but refuse to tell McNally who sold them their information.

Despite this development, the three men gain a mutual respect for each other. After the war ends, McNally visits Cordona and Tuscarora as they are being released. He asks them once more about the traitors, but all they can provide is a physical description. However, they agree to contact McNally if they see either of the two men again.

Sometime later, McNally is contacted by his friend Sherriff Pat Cronin of Blackthorne, Texas. Cronin tells McNally that Cordona is staying at the local hotel and wants to talk to him. When McNally arrives in Blackthorne, he meets a young woman, Shasta Delaney, who has come to report the murder of her employer by a deputy of Rio Lobo's sheriff, "Blue Tom" Hendricks. Shortly afterwards, a posse from Rio Lobo arrives and wants to take Delaney away. Delaney identifies their leader, "Whitey" Carter, as the murderer she was referring to. When one of the posse aims a gun at Cronin, Delaney shoots Whitey from under the table, resulting in a shoot-out in which McNally, Cronin and Cordona finish off the posse.

Cordona identifies Whitey as one of the traitors that McNally was looking for. He tells McNally that Tuscarora needs help; his father and other ranchers are having land stolen by a rich man named Ketcham, who had the previous sheriff killed and installed Hendricks in his place. McNally, Cordona, and Delaney go to Rio Lobo, where they find the people living in terror of Hendricks and his men. Tuscarora's girlfriend Maria hides them in her house, while her friend Amelita distracts Hendricks' men. Hendricks has Tuscarora arrested on trumped-up charges, so McNally's group goes to get help from Tuscarora's father, Old Man Philips. 

McNally, Cordona, and Philips sneak into Ketcham's ranch, and McNally discovers that Ketcham is really Union Sergeant Major Ike Gorman, the second traitor he was searching for. McNally attacks Gorman and forces him to sign the deeds back to their rightful owners. Taking Gorman hostage, they send Cordona ahead to find the United States Cavalry. Upon arrival in Rio Lobo, they discover that Hendricks has beaten Maria and disfigured Amelita's face with a knife for helping McNally. Amelita swears to McNally that she will kill Hendricks herself.

The men force Hendricks' party out of the jail and hole up there with Tuscarora to await the Cavalry. However, Hendricks' men capture Cordona before he gets far, and offer to trade him for Gorman. During the prisoner exchange, Cordona manages to give his captors the slip. McNally tells Hendricks that Gorman is no longer of any use to the sheriff, since he signed back the deeds. Angered, Hendricks guns down his own boss, starting a firefight in which he and McNally are wounded.

After a failed attempt to blow up the cantina McNally's allies are using as a base, Hendricks' men are outflanked by the rest of the townspeople, who have rallied to help. Hendricks' men abandon him. Hendricks tries to shoot at them, but he has been using his rifle as a crutch and, with its muzzle clogged with dust, it explodes in his face. As he stumbles to his horse, Amelita shoots him, thus fulfilling her promise to McNally.

Cast 

 John Wayne as Col. Cord McNally
 Jorge Rivero as Capt. Pierre "Frenchy" Cordona
 Jennifer O'Neill as Shasta Delaney
 Christopher Mitchum as Sgt. Tuscarora Phillips
 Jack Elam as Phillips
 Victor French as Sgt. Major Ike Gorman/"Ketcham"
 Susana Dosamantes as María Carmen
 Sherry Lansing as Amelita
 David Huddleston as Dr. Ivor Jones – Dentist
 Mike Henry as Rio Lobo Sheriff "Blue Tom" Hendricks
 Bill Williams as Blackthorne Sheriff Pat Cronin
 Jim Davis as Rio Lobo Deputy
 Dean Smith as Bide
 Robert Donner as Deputy Whitey Carter
 Hank Worden as Hank – Hotel Manager
 Peter Jason as Lt. Ned Forsythe
 Edward Faulkner as Lt. Harris
 Chuck Courtney as Chuck
 George Plimpton as 4th Gunman
 Don "Red" Barry as Bartender

Production
The film was meant to be shot in Durango, Mexico on a budget of $5 million. However, shooting on the movie Lawman took up facilities there, so Hawks and Cinema Center had to spend an extra $1 million to allow shooting at Old Tucson Studios, and near Los Angeles. The film was shot in Technicolor.

Hawks was injured while filming the railway scene, requiring four stitches.

Hawks said he had to fight Cinema Center to cast Chris Mitchum (whose father was actor Robert Mitchum) in the movie.

The script was rewritten throughout production.

Reception
The film made US$4.25 million in rentals, twentieth among the highest money-making pictures of the year, but it grossed $2 million less than its $6 million budget, making it a box-office bomb.

Upon release, the film received mostly negative reviews. Variety wrote that "Hawks' direction is as listless as the plot". Roger Ebert, who gave the film 3 out of 4 stars, wrote, "Rio Lobo is just a shade tired, especially after the finely honed humor and action of El Dorado." Roger Greenspun of The New York Times said that the film was "close enough to greatness to stand above everything else so far in the current season." His comments surprised other critics and resulted in numerous angry letters sent to the newspaper.

In retrospective, the film does have better reviews from contemporary critics. In Rotten Tomatoes the film has a 70% rating, based in 23 reviews, with an average rating of 6.10/10. The consensus is that "Howard Hawks and John Wayne reunite to riff on their own Rio Bravo, and while the results are less memorable the movie does offer a curiously cynical perspective." In a retrospective review, Jonathan Rosenbaum wrote, "The fact that its best action sequence, the first, was directed by the second unit is emblematic of Hawks's relative lack of engagement with the material." TV Guide wrote, "for such a refined director as Hawks to end his career on a note like this, having made some of the finest films in the history of American cinema, is an atrocity not worth the silver used in the negative." Writing for Time Out, Geoff Andrew said, "If it lacks the formal perfection of Rio Bravo and the moving elegy for men grown old of El Dorado, it's still a marvellous film". Empire writer Ian Nathan wrote in January 2000, "this well-bred Western is just a routine canter through themes and gunfights as worn as the saddles." Quentin Tarantino cited Rio Lobo as one of the reasons he wanted to have a short directing career: "the most cutting-edge artist, the coolest guys, the hippest dudes, they’re the ones that stay at the party too long. They’re the ones that make those last two or three movies that are completely out of touch and do not realize the world has turned on them [...] I don’t want to make Rio Lobo."

Soundtrack
 
The music for Rio Lobo was composed by Jerry Goldsmith. The soundtrack album was released in Belgium in 2001 on Prometheus Records.

See also

 List of American films of 1970
 John Wayne filmography

References

External links
 
 
 
 
 

1970 films
1970 Western (genre) films
American Civil War films
American Western (genre) films
Films scored by Jerry Goldsmith
Films directed by Howard Hawks
Films shot in Arizona
Films shot in Mexico
Films produced by John Wayne
Films with screenplays by Leigh Brackett
Cinema Center Films films
1970s English-language films
1970s American films